George Leer (1748 at Hambledon, Hampshire – 1 February 1812 at Petersfield, Hampshire) was a famous English cricketer who played for Hampshire in the time of the Hambledon Club.

Leer began playing in the 1760s.  His name has become almost synonymous with the now archaic long stop fielding position (i.e., directly behind the wicket-keeper) that was deemed so necessary in underarm days.

According to Arthur Haygarth, Leer "was a good and successful bat, but was mostly famous as long-stop to Thomas Brett’s tremendous bowling in the Hambledon matches.  He was always called "Little George", and was a fine singer, having a sweet counter-tenor voice.  In John Nyren’s book, he is stated to have been a native of Hambledon, but latterly he was a brewer, residing at Petersfield, where he died".

George Leer was a small man who made 44 known first-class appearances from the 1772 season to 1782.

References

Further reading
 Ashley Mote, The Glory Days of Cricket, Robson, 1997
 David Underdown, Start of Play, Allen Lane, 2000

English cricketers
Hampshire cricketers
English cricketers of 1701 to 1786
1748 births
1812 deaths
Hambledon cricketers